"Let Me Be the One" is a song by German singer Sasha. It was written by Sasha, Pete Boyd Smith, Michael Kersting, and Stephan Baader for Sasha's second studio album ...you (2000), while production was overseen by the latter two under their production moniker Grant Michael B. and Pomez di Lorenzo. Released as the album's lead single, it reached the top in the Flemish portion of Belgium and the top 20 in Germany and Switzerland.

Track listing

Credits and personnel 
Credits adapted from the liner notes of ...you.

Music and lyrics – Pomez di Lorenzo, Grant Michael B.
Lead and backing vocals – Sasha
Guitar – Raymond Blake Jr.
Mixing – Falk Moller, Michael B.

Charts

Weekly charts

References

External links 
 

2000 singles
2000 songs
Sasha (German singer) songs